The Synchronous Backplane Interconnect (SBI) was the internal processor-memory bus used by early VAX computers manufactured by the Digital Equipment Corporation of Maynard, Massachusetts.

The bus was implemented using Schottky TTL logic levels and allowed multiprocessor operation.

Computer buses
DEC hardware